This is a list of dams and reservoirs in Aragon, Spain.

List

See also 
 List of dams and reservoirs
 List of dams and reservoirs in Spain

External links 

 Reservoirs status summary 

Aragon
Aragon